Vanessa Beauchaints is a beauty queen who represented Martinique in Miss World 2007 in China.  She has a Bachelor of History degree and studied to become an interior designer.

References

1985 births
Living people
People from Ducos
Martiniquais beauty pageant winners
Miss World 2007 delegates